Agrapha orbifer is a moth of the family Noctuidae. It is found on La Réunion.

References
Guenée, 1865. Lépidoptères de Madagascar. – In: Vinson, A. Voyage à Madagascar au couronnement de Radama II, Annexe F. Lépidoptères. - — :25–48; pls. 4–7

Plusiinae
Moths described in 1865
Moths of Réunion
Moths of Africa